Viertel is a German word meaning "quarter", and may refer to:

Surname
 Viertel (surname)

Places
 Bahnhofsviertel, a district (Stadtteil) of Frankfurt am Main, Germany
 Holländisches Viertel (Dutch Quarter), a neighborhood in Potsdam
 Mostviertel (Most Quarter) in Lower Austria
 Waldviertel (Forest Quarter) in Lower Austria
 Weinviertel (Wine Quarter) in Lower Austria
 Industrieviertel (Industrial Quarter) in Lower Austria
 Jesse Viertel Memorial Airport, also known as Jesse P. Viertel Airport, an airport in Cooper County, Missouri, United States
 Märkisches Viertel, a locality (Ortsteil) in the borough (Bezirk) of Reinickendorf in Berlin, Germany
 Nikolaiviertel (Nikolai Quarter) in Berlin, Germany
 Viertel (Bremen), a district of Bremen, Germany